Kunauli is a town located in the Supaul (old Saharsa) district of Bihar, India on the border of Nepal's Saptari District.

Koshi and Kunauli
The Western Embankment Bank of Koshi runs through Kunauli. During the floods in 1948, 1949, 1954, 1955, 1958 etc., it has severely affected the convex bends of western bank at several places like Kunauli Bazar.

The flood generally do great damage to the road leading to the Kunauli town and wash out its 3 kilometres portion. The water of the Koshi river pour out from the breach that develops in its western embankment and submerge a large portion of it.

References

External links

Cities and towns in Supaul district
Transit and customs posts along the India–Nepal border